Edgar "Ned" Willsher (22 November 1828 – 7 October 1885) was an English cricketer known for being a catalyst in the shift from roundarm to overarm bowling. A left-handed bowler, and useful lower-order batsman, Willsher played first-class cricket for Kent County Cricket Club between 1850 and 1875. He took over 1,300 first-class wickets, despite only having one lung. He led a tour of Canada and the United States in 1868, and after retiring from his playing career became an umpire.

Career

Early years
Willsher was born at Little Halden Farm, in Rolvenden, Kent. His older brother, senior by over ten years, William Willsher, would go on to have an inauspicious career with Kent three years before Edgar's own debut when, in 1847, he appeared in one first-class match, scoring a pair at number eleven and not bowling. Edgar Willsher made his own debut on 11 July 1850 at the Kennington Oval against Surrey. He took four wickets in Surrey's first innings, but was not required to bat again as Kent were dismissed successively for 52 and 84 when following on after Surrey's 248. Willsher waited over a year for his next game, against the All England Eleven on 24 July 1851. This time Kent secured a draw, with Willsher taking four wickets in a match truncated by rain. He played only one other game in 1851, finishing the season with only eleven wickets though they were taken at an economical 17.50 runs per wicket. He gradually became a more regular feature of the Kent side from 1853, with thirty-nine appearances over the next four years. He took thirty-two wickets in 1854, including a then career-best 7/22. He then passed fifty wickets in the season for the first time during the 1856 season, taking 66 in total at 10.76 runs per wicket from only eight games. This included four ten-wicket match hauls. He then bettered his efforts with 71 wickets from ten games in 1857, though could only take 29 scalps in 1858 playing only six games. Seventy-nine wickets in 1859, and one better in 1860 established Willsher as a key bowler for Kent, as he regularly featured in their starting XI with fourteen games in each season. The 1860 season also saw his career-best innings figures of 8/16, as well as his first noted successes with the bat, scoring his maiden half century, one of four for the season. Fifteen more games in 1861 yielded another career-best 87 wickets in the season, and his second eight-wicket haul.

Overarm bowling
By the early 1860s, roundarm had replaced underarm as the standard form of bowling but overarm was still illegal, even though it was in occasional use. Laws of the sport were modified in 1845 in an attempt to limit the ever increasing height of the bowler's arm. On 26 August 1862 at The Oval, Willsher became the first cricketer to be no-balled for bowling overarm. Playing for an England XI against Surrey he was called six times by umpire John Lillywhite for delivering the ball when his hand was above his shoulder. Outraged, Willsher left the field in protest with eight of his professional colleagues (the two amateurs in the England team remained on the field) and play was abandoned for the rest of the day. When Lillywhite refused to accept the legality of Willsher's action, he was replaced as umpire so that the game could continue. Willsher went on to take 6 for 49. As a result of this incident, which may well have been planned in advance in order to force the issue, the laws were changed and overarm bowling was legalised from the beginning of the 1864 season. Meanwhile, the 1863 season saw another 80 wickets for Willsher, as well as 494 runs with the bat, including three half-centuries. The runs scored during the season, and his highest score of 89, would remain his career best.

Later career
1864 saw more success for Willsher in the County Championship with 79 more wickets at 13.84 runs each, though he failed to pass 50 with the bat. Though he then struggled with only 47 wickets in 1865, he remained consistent with 52 scalps in 1866 and 51 more in the following season, though again failing with the bat with a best over both years of 46. The 1868 season, however was the best of Willsher's career with the ball, taking in a hot and dry summer 113 wickets at only 9.98 runs per wicket, the second occasion – and one of only three in his entire career – where Willsher's season average was under 10.00. This included twelve five-wicket hauls, and six ten-wicket hauls, both career-best performances. Though once again struggling with the bat, scoring 246 runs at 10.69, Willsher's 113 wickets was second in the list of wicket-takers for the 1868 season, behind only future Test player James Southerton, and Willsher's average easily out-performed Southerton's 13.76. Willsher enjoyed successes in 1869 and 1870, with 64 and 84 wickets respectively, and took 70 more wickets in 1871; however Willsher, by then forty-two years of age, began to enjoy fewer returns for his bowling. From 1872 until retirement in 1875 he never bettered 35 wickets in a season, though he averages remained strong and his five-wicket hauls consistent. His appearances for Kent began to diminish, and in 1874 he played only seven matches, not passing fifty with the bat after 1869, and taking only two ten-wicket hauls in his final four seasons compared to thirteen in the proceeding four.

Willsher played only two games in the 1875 season. The first, on 17 June against Hampshire, saw Willsher take four wickets in a convincing Kent innings victory, It was his final appearance for his county. In the last game of his first-class career on 19 August between two invitation XI's representing the North and South of the country, Willsher, playing alongside WG Grace, made only one run and was not called on to bowl.

References

External links
 

1828 births
1885 deaths
English cricketers
Kent cricketers
All-England Eleven cricketers
English cricketers of 1826 to 1863
English cricketers of 1864 to 1889
United South of England Eleven cricketers
People from Rolvenden
Marylebone Cricket Club cricketers
Players cricketers
North v South cricketers
Southgate cricketers
North of the Thames v South of the Thames cricketers
Gentlemen of England cricketers
Players of the South cricketers
Gentlemen of Kent cricketers